A leadership election was held in the TOP 09 party in the Czech Republic on 8 December 2013. Incumbent Karel Schwarzenberg was unopposed yet again. He received 160 of the 174 votes.

Results

References

TOP 09 leadership elections
TOP 09 leadership election
TOP 09 leadership election
TOP 09 leadership election